Büchen is an Amt ("collective municipality") in the district of Lauenburg, in Schleswig-Holstein, Germany. Its seat is in Büchen.

The Amt Büchen consists of the following municipalities (population in 2005 between brackets):

Ämter in Schleswig-Holstein